Jumpei Furuya (born 18 May 1991) is a Japanese triathlete. He won the gold medal in the men's triathlon at the 2018 Asian Games in Jakarta, Indonesia.

He also won the gold medal in the mixed relay event.

References 

Living people
1991 births
Place of birth missing (living people)
Japanese male triathletes
Asian Games medalists in triathlon
Triathletes at the 2018 Asian Games
Asian Games gold medalists for Japan
Medalists at the 2018 Asian Games
20th-century Japanese people
21st-century Japanese people